Events from the year 1846 in France.

Incumbents
 Monarch – Louis Philippe I

Events
1 August - Legislative election held for the seventh legislature of the July Monarchy.
19 September - Our Lady of La Salette apparition.
Dubonnet first sold.

Births
1 January - Léon Denis, spiritist philosopher and researcher (died 1927)
4 April - Comte de Lautréamont, poet (died 1870)
8 May - Émile Gallé, artist (died 1904)
21 May - Luc-Olivier Merson, painter and illustrator (died 1920)
11 July - Léon Bloy, novelist, essayist, pamphleteer and poet (died 1917)
8 August - Élisabeth Renaud, teacher, socialist activist, and feminist (died 1932)
21 August - Étienne Bazeries, military cryptanalyst (died 1931)
2 September - Paul Déroulède, author and politician (died 1914)
24 October - Denis Jean Achille Luchaire, historian (died 1908)
28 October - Albert Dubois-Pillet, painter and army officer (died 1890)
28 October - Auguste Escoffier, chef, restaurateur and culinary writer (died 1935)
30 October - Victor, 5th duc de Broglie, aristocrat (died 1906)

Full date unknown
Arsène Darmesteter, philologist (died 1888)

Deaths
17 June - Jean-Gaspard Deburau, actor and mime (born 1796)
25 July - Louis Bonaparte, brother of Napoleon I of France (born 1778)
16 August - Sylvain Charles Valée, Marshal of France (born 1773)
22 December - Jean Baptiste Bory de Saint-Vincent, naturalist (born 1778)

Full date unknown
Thérèse Albert, actress (b. c. 1805)
Jacques-Antoine-Adrien Delort, general and deputy (born 1773)
Ambroise-Louis-Marie d'Hozier, last of the juges d'armes of France (born 1764)
Joseph Balthasar, Comte Siméon, politician (born 1781)

References

1840s in France